Mingin (Min Gin, Min Kin or Minking ) is a town on the southern side (right bank) of the Chindwin River in Kale District, Sagaing Division, Myanmar.  It is the administrative center for Mingin Township.

Notes

External links
 "Mingin Map — Satellite Images of Mingin" Maplandia

Populated places in Kale District
Mingin Township
Township capitals of Myanmar